Patrick O'Flanagan (born 1947 in Dublin, Ireland) is an Irish geographer and academic.

Career
He is emeritus professor of the Department of Geography at University College Cork, Ireland. He was the former Head of this department. At present, he contributes regularly to the Socio-Territorial Research Group at the University of Santiago de Compostela (Galicia).

His research is mainly focused on Atlantic Europe - with a particular interest in Galicia and Atlantic Iberia - from the perspective of cultural and historical Geography. O'Flanagan helped to define and standardise the actual concept of Atlantic Europe. Other research deals with comparative evolution of port cities, rural change, housing and settlement studies.

Partial bibliography

The Living Landscape, Kilgalligan, Erris, County Mayo, (with S. O Cathain), Dublin, 1974.
Rural Ireland, 1600-1900: Modernization and Change, (with P. Ferguson and K. Whelan), Cork, 1987.
Bandon, Irish Historic Towns Atlas, No.3, Dublin, 1988.
Cork, History and Society, (with N. Buttimer), Cork, 1993.
Xeografía Histórica de Galicia, Xerais, Vigo, 1996.
"Galicia en el marco geográfico y histórico de la Europa Atlántica", in Xeográfica I, pp. 115–133, Santiago de Compostela, 2001.
Port cities of Atlantic Iberia, c. 1500-1900, Aldershot, 2008.

References

External links
"Profile of Professor Patrick O'Flanagan at UCC"

See also
Atlantic Europe

Irish geographers
Academics of University College Cork
1947 births
20th-century Irish people
21st-century Irish people
Living people
Cultural geographers